The 2015 Open Engie de Touraine was a professional tennis tournament played on indoor hard courts. It was the eleventh edition of the tournament and part of the 2015 ITF Women's Circuit, offering a total of $50,000 in prize money. It took place in Joué-lès-Tours, France, on 19–25 October 2015.

Singles main draw entrants

Seeds 

 1 Rankings as of 12 October 2015

Other entrants 
The following players received wildcards into the singles main draw:
  Lou Brouleau
  Chloé Cirotte
  Margot Decker
  Emmanuelle Salas

The following players received entry from the qualifying draw:
  Başak Eraydın
  Olga Fridman
  Michaela Hončová
  Patty Schnyder

Champions

Singles

 Olga Fridman def.  Kristýna Plíšková, 6–2, 3–6, 6–1

Doubles

 Alexandra Cadanțu /  Cristina Dinu def.  Viktorija Golubic /  Alice Matteucci, 7–5, 6–3

External links 
 2015 Open Engie de Touraine at ITFtennis.com
  

2015 ITF Women's Circuit
2015
2015 in French tennis